The 47th District of the Iowa Senate is located in eastern Iowa, and is currently composed of Scott County.

Current elected officials
Roby Smith is the senator currently representing the 47th District.

The area of the 47th District contains two Iowa House of Representatives districts:
The 93rd District (represented by Phyllis Thede)
The 94th District (represented by Gary Mohr)

The district is also located in Iowa's 2nd congressional district, which is represented by Mariannette Miller-Meeks.

Past senators
The district has previously been represented by:

John L. Buren, 1965–1966
J. Henry Lucken, 1967–1970
Charles Laverty, 1971–1972
Richard Ramsey, 1973–1982
Calvin Hultman, 1983–1990
Derryl McLaren, 1991–1992
Donald Gettings, 1993–1998
David Miller, 1999–2002
Keith Kreiman, 2003–2010
Mark Chelgren, 2011–2012
Roby Smith, 2013–present

References

47